Bala Bijar Ankish (also Romanized as Bālā Bījār Ankīsh; also known as Bījār Ankīsh-e Bālā) is a village in Ahandan Rural District, in the Central District of Lahijan County, Gilan Province, Iran. At the 2006 census, its population was 38, in 7 families.

References 

Populated places in Lahijan County